Eline Berger (born 28 March 1997) is a Dutch coxswain. She competed in the men's eight event at the 2020 Summer Olympics as cox for the team.

References

External links
 

1997 births
Living people
Dutch female rowers
Olympic rowers of the Netherlands
Rowers at the 2020 Summer Olympics
People from Leudal
Coxswains (rowing)
21st-century Dutch women
20th-century Dutch women
20th-century Dutch people
Sportspeople from Limburg (Netherlands)